St George's Park Cricket Ground (commonly known as St George's Park, Crusaders Ground or simply Crusaders) is a cricket ground in St George's Park, South Africa. It is the home of the Port Elizabeth Cricket Club, one of the oldest cricket clubs in South Africa, and the Eastern Province Club. It is also one of the venues at which Test matches and One Day Internationals are played in South Africa. It is older than Kingswood College in Grahamstown. The ground is notable for its brass band that plays during major matches, adding a unique flavour to its atmosphere.

The ground hosted its first Test match in March 1889 when England defeated South Africa by 8 wickets. This was South Africa’s first Test match. , there have been 21 Test matches played at the ground of which South Africa has won 8 and their opponents 9 with 4 draws.

The first One Day International played at the ground was in December 1992 when South Africa beat India by 6 wickets. , there have been 25 One Day Internationals played at the ground including five in the Cricket World Cup in 2003.

Official name
The ground's official name is acknowledging a commercial sponsorship arrangement. However South African and other cricket fans continue to call the ground by its historic name, just "St George’s Park". Its nickname is "The Dragon's Lair" based on the famous legend of St George.

2003 Cricket World Cup
St George's Park was one of 15 venues in South Africa, Zimbabwe and Kenya selected to host matches during the world cup. It hosted 5 matches during the tournament, including 3 group games, 1 super six game and a semi-final.

2009 Indian Premier League
When the 2009 IPL was moved to South Africa, St George's Park was chosen as one of eight venues in South Africa to host matches. The ground hosted a seven matches, all of them were group games.

Warriors Cricket
The stadium is one of the Warriors' 2 home grounds, the other being East London's Buffalo Park. The stadium hosts Warriors home matches in the Sunfoil Series, Momentum 1 Day Cup (previously the MTN Domestic Championship) and Ram Slam T20 Challenge.

See also
List of Test cricket grounds
List of international cricket centuries at St George's Park
List of international five-wicket hauls at St George's Park

References

External links

Cricinfo ground profile
St George's Park history website

Buildings and structures in Port Elizabeth
Saint George's Park
Sport in Port Elizabeth
Test cricket grounds in South Africa
2003 Cricket World Cup stadiums
Sports venues in the Eastern Cape